Pathu Pathu is a 2008 Tamil language erotic thriller film written and directed by Sathyam. The film stars Sona Heiden, Thalaivasal Vijay and Bose Venkat, with Krishna, Sanjith, Chengalpattu Maran, Padma Narayanan, Manimaran, Swaminathan and Ashish playing supporting roles. The film, produced by Rajeswari Gnanasambandam, had musical score by L. Vaidyanathan's son L. V. Ganesan and was released on 25 July 2008. The film was dubbed into Telugu as Madanmohini.

Plot

The film begins with a dead body of cinema director Subbu being found lying in a suitcase under a bridge. The tough police inspector Venkat is assigned to unravel the mystery behind the death.

Venkat first interrogates advocate Valli for killing him. She confesses to him that she had found Subbu's dead body in her kitchen yesterday night and put him in a suitcase. She blames her archenemy P. T. Arun, a film producer, for murdering him. P. T. Arun then confesses that he and his assistant Kannan attempted to kill Valli by poisoning her milk, but failed. According to the forensic report, the fingerprints of the three suspects didn't match with the fingerprints taken on the body. Venkat then arrests a funeral dancer who had a fight with Subbu in a public place and a dumb pickpocket but soon, he realizes that they are innocents. His investigation leads to Subbu's wife Mohini, and she reveals everything.

Subbu was a lofty film director who struggled to deliver a hit film, he was known for being short-tempered and getting into trouble easily. With his entire focus centered on his profession, he failed to take care of his sexually frustrated wife Mohini. When the college student Vinoth entered his house for the stay, Sona and Vinoth became closer, thus having an illegal affair. When Subbu learned of the affair, he was devastated and stepped out of the house.

Later, an eyewitness admits that he has seen Subbu having a fight with Nizam Ali the night of the murder. When the police chase him, Nizam Ali dies in a motorbike accident. The lack of further clues means that the murder investigation came to a dead-end and the murder case remains unsolved.

Cast

Sona Heiden as Mohini
Thalaivasal Vijay as Subbu
Bose Venkat as Venkat
Krishna as P. T. Arun
Sanjith as Nizam Ali
Chengalpattu Maran as Pickpocket
Padma Narayanan as Advocate Valli
Manimaran as Funeral dancer
Swaminathan as Kannan
Ashish as Vinoth
Munnar Ramesh as Inspector Ravi
Raviraj as Kanagasabai
Manager Cheena as Venkat's father
Rajadurai
Harshavardhan
Sarathbabu
Vasu Sathish
Poochi Senthil
Rubachandran
Arumbakka Soundararajan
S. I. Kumar
Abhinayashree in a special appearance
Bhoomika in a special appearance
Priyanka in a special appearance
Laksha in a special appearance

Production
Engineer turned director Sathyam made his directorial debut with the soft erotic thriller Pathu Pathu under Indian Dream Makers banner. Actress Sona Heiden was selected to play the role of a housewife who eyes a young relative of her with lustful leys, and the film had Sanjith, Bose Venkat and Thalaivasal Vijay playing significant roles. L. V. Ganesan, the son of veteran musician L. Vaidyanathan, scored for the film.

Soundtrack

The film score and the soundtrack were composed by L. V. Ganesan. The soundtrack, released on 21 March 2008, features 5 tracks with lyrics written by Yugabharathi, Muthu Vijayan and J. Saleeem.

Release

The film was released on 25 July 2008 alongside another erotic film Sutta Pazham. The two films releasing that week were butchered by the censor board and carries 'A' certificates as they had an overdose of sex and smutty dialogues.

Critical reception

Sify rated the film as "titillating" and said, "The film is strictly for audiences who are looking at skin show and sleaze". Another critic stated, "this film implies of good efforts from the director and has a good message for the society that at present is  annoying morals" and called it "average". S. Viswanath of Deccan Herald wrote, "Pathu Pathu is an engaging entertainer that has audiences in thrall stitching a moralistic tale of Fatal Attraction and Basic Instinct". Another reviewer stated, "Pathu Pathu's screen time runs for a crisp two hours and has a limited cast. Though the storyline is interesting, instead of utilizing its strength, director Sathyam has totally banked on heroine Sona's glamour. Unfortunately, the overdose fails to strike a chord with the audience".

Box office

The film had successfully completed its 100 days of run in Tamil and Malayalam languages. The film was dubbed into Telugu as Madanmohini and was released on 9 March 2012 by producer R. G. under Siri Meghana Creations banner.

References

2008 films
2000s Tamil-language films
Indian erotic thriller films
Indian nonlinear narrative films
2008 directorial debut films